Laurence Hope may refer to:

Laurence Hope (artist) (born 1927), Australian artist
Laurence Hope (poet) (1865–1904), English poet, pseudonym of Adela Florence Nicolson

See also
Larry Hope